Hattie Hart (c. 1900 - after 1946) was an American Memphis blues singer and songwriter. She was active as a recording artist from the late 1920s to the mid-1930s. Her best known tracks are "I Let My Daddy Do That" and "Coldest Stuff in Town". She worked as a solo artist and as a singer with the Memphis Jug Band. Little is known of her life outside music.

It was stated that "Hart wrote gritty songs about love, sex, cocaine and voodoo".

Career
Hart was born in Memphis, Tennessee, around 1900. She first recorded with the Memphis Jug Band in 1928. She had a reputation for the parties that she hosted at this time. She also sang in the Beale Street area of Memphis, busking with various musicians, where she became one of the best-known performers. Hart's singing style has been compared to that of Sara Martin. She has been described as a "marvellous, tough voiced singer".

Her earliest recording with the Memphis Jug Band was a song she wrote, "Won't You Be Kind?" (1928), with blues dialect in the lyrics: "Now twenty-five cents a saucer, seventy-five cents a cup, But it's an extra dollar papa, if you mean to keep it up." Five recordings of Hart with the Jug Band between 1928 and 1930 are known to exist. She undertook a recording session of her own in September 1934, with Allen Shaw and one other musician, whom some blues historians believe was Memphis Willie B. Hart recorded fourteen tracks for Vocalion Records, only four of which were released at the time.

Hart moved to Chicago, and it is believed she recorded there in 1938 under the name Hattie Bolten. It is not reported whether this was her married name or a pseudonym. After that, she disappeared from public attention, and no further details of her life are known.

Hart's song "I Let My Daddy Do That" was covered by Holly Golightly on her 1997 album Painted On.

Recordings

See also
List of country blues musicians

References

Year of birth missing
Year of death missing
Place of death missing
African-American women singers
American blues singers
Memphis blues musicians
Country blues singers
People from Memphis, Tennessee
Songwriters from Tennessee
Victor Records artists
African-American songwriters